Eberly is a surname. Notable people with the surname include:

Angelina Eberly (1798–1860)
Bob Eberly (1916–1981), American singer
Don Eberly (born 1953), American writer
George A. Eberly (1871–1958), Justice of the Nebraska Supreme Court
Janice Eberly (born c. 1964), American economist
Joseph H. Eberly (born 1935), American physicist
Lynn Eberly (fl. 1990s–2010s), American statistician
Robert E. Eberly (1918–2004), American chief executive

See also
Eberle
Everly (disambiguation)